The ITV network of the United Kingdom began in 1955 as a network of independent broadcasters, each responsible for its own advertising. When the Channel 4/S4C network arrived in 1982, each regional ITV company also provided the content of advertising breaks for the new network, covering the same transmitter area as itself.
As each station therefore had a monopoly over TV advertising in its own area, many stations were able to charge high prices of slots. Over the course of the 1980s an increase in competition from cable and satellite systems and even Channel 4 from January 1993 (when it became independent of ITV), began a decrease in advertisement revenue for many ITV stations.

In 1989, two ITV companies, Central Independent Television and Anglia Television, became the first to have a joint sales team via a single organisations to deal with advertising, which allowed for reduced operational costs while offering a larger number of potential customers. By 1992, areas with "sales house" were reported in having the best areas for advertising revenue.

From January to July 1993, the remaining ITV companies (Scottish Television, HTV, Grampian and Westcountry as well as S4C) which were not initially part of "sales house" created their own joint operations to help improve their sales operations, before moving to other more established sales groups within ITV.

Television Sales and Marketing Services Ltd
In 1989, Central Independent Television sales managing director, Dick Emery, and Anglia Television sales managing director, Tim Wooton, established Television Sales and Marketing Services Ltd (TSMS), the first joint venture (sales house) which provided airtime sales and programme sponsorships. The company was created to deal with contracting advertising sales for the two companies and to provide better resources to overcome the problems and reduce costs.

In 1991, TSMS acquired the airtime sales operation of Ulster Television and Border Television. Dick Emery then left the company to join the board of ITN as its first commercial director. In September 1992 the advertising share and revenue of Central (5%) and Anglia (1.4%) both increased, which drew praise from the advertising sector and companies.

In July 1993, a new joint advertising company, Merlin, was created by Meridian Broadcasting, HTV, Westcountry Television, Channel Television, and S4C, mainly run by Meridian and HTV. In March 1994, Anglia acquired Central's 43% stake and Tim Wooton's 14% stake in the company to take full control of operations. Central left the company and moved over to Carlton Communications's sales house operations, while TSMS merged with Merlin, which had only been trading between the beginning of January and the end of July. In October 1994, TSMS took over the responsibility of Scottish Television's and Grampian Television's sale operations. TSMS acted as consultant to international broadcasters such as BBC Select, Nederland 1 in the Netherlands.

In January 1997, Tim Wooton become chief executive of TSMS, before leaving the company to join ZenithOptimedia, a media buying agency, in April 1997. On certain occasions the sales house did not deliver on improved growth, in early 1997, HTV reported reduced profits, compared to the year before. It entered into a new contract with TSMS, with penalties if it did not meet its goal in raising HTV's share.

In 2000, Granada Media bought out United News & Media (owners of TSMS) and it was merged with Laser Sales on 1 October 2000. HTV, Grampian TV, Scottish TV and Westcountry Television left the company to join up with Carlton's sales house.

Laser Sales
Laser Sales was set up by LWT in 1990; the sales team also dealt with TVS. In October 1993, Yorkshire Television's and Tyne Tees Television's sales operations, MAS, become part of Laser Sales.

Before Granada controlled Laser Sales, the company in July 1993 created a northern advertising sales company,The Time Exchange, along with Scottish Television which also dealt with Border and Grampian.

In January 1994, Granada took over LWT, which resulted in the deal being in breach of regulation due to the amount of airtime being controlled by one company, which resulted in Scottish and Grampian leaving the operation to join TSMS. Laser Sales by autumn 1994, covered LWT, Granada, Yorkshire, and Tyne Tees.

Yorkshire-Tyne Tees Television suggested it might terminate its contract with Laser Sales due to the continual decline in advertising revenue which was in part of speculations that Granada was planning to buy Yorkshire-Tyne Tees Television which happened eight months later.

Carlton UK Sales
In January 1994, Carlton took over Central Independent Television. After restructuring the two companies, the sales operations were merged into one on 1 September 1994.

In late 2000, after the merger of Laser Sales and TSMS,  SMG (which by now owned Scottish TV and Grampian TV),  HTV, and Westcountry Television switched its sales contract to Carlton on 1 January 2001.

See also
 ITV (TV network)
 ITV (TV channel)
 History of ITV

References

External links
ITV Media

1989 establishments in the United Kingdom
ITV (TV network)
Mass media companies of the United Kingdom